Jack Andrew Batty is an Australian politician. He has been a Liberal Party of Australia member of the South Australian House of Assembly since a July 2022 by-election, representing the electorate of Bragg.

Prior to entering politics, Batty was a lawyer, a staffer for federal minister Christopher Pyne and an aide to High Commissioner to the United Kingdom George Brandis. He was the Liberal candidate for the safe Labor seat of Cheltenham at the 2014 state election.

Batty and his wife Charlotte grew up in the eastern suburbs of Adelaide and bought their first home there around 2015.

References

Liberal Party of Australia members of the Parliament of South Australia
Living people
Year of birth missing (living people)
Members of the South Australian House of Assembly